Jalaun State was a Maratha princely state in the Bundelkhand region. It was centered on Jalaun, in present-day Jalaun district, Uttar Pradesh. The town was the capital of the state from 1806 to 1840. The last Raja died without issue and Jalaun State was subsequently annexed by the East India Company.

History
Originally a part of the Maratha Empire, it was later that the British occupied the area in 1803 and Jalaun state became a British protectorate in 1806. 
Many of the inhabitants were Maharashtrian Brahmins, known as 'Dakhini Pandits'. Their ancestors had been at the service of the Maratha Peshwa. Govindrao II, its last ruler, died without a male issue in 1840 and the state was annexed by the British in the same year. Govind rao II daughter was married in Karwi which was a sanad satate established in 1818.

The fortified post of Kalpi, the former residence of the rulers of Jalaun State, was dismantled in 1860 and its place was taken by a market known as Baithganj. After the annexation the British authorities preferred Orai as capital of the district, claiming that Jalaun was an unhealthy place.

Rulers
All the rulers of Jalaun State were under Peshwa Government of Pune. Karkare Dynasty (also known as Hrigvediya Karkare Ballal Karhade Brahmins, basically belonged to Ratnagiri of Maharashtra were appointed by Peshwa Sawai Madhorao (II) Narayan Bhatt Ballal as local administrators in 1793 AD, under the protection of Shreenath Mahadji Shinde (also known as Madhavrao (I) Scindia, Patilbawa. Later on in 1795, jalun was placed under the assistance of Yashwant rao of Kalinjar, with whom they had marriage alliances. Yashwant Bhatt was killed in action in 1796, This Naikhai war was fought in Vindhya, which was supported by British East India Company agents. This led to Jalon being in weak position by killing of his able  commander. The Karkares tried to save Jaluan from the East India co. and thus fought against British Army during the famous Second Maratha – Anglo War. English Army won and the Maratha Army under Karkare Dynasty was killed brutally. Later on the fugitives settled in Gwalior, Banda and Jhansi. Administration of Jalaun was transferred to another Maharashtrian Brahmin family Deshastha Brahmins and bore the title "Raja".

Later on in the famous time frame of 1857, the Jalon along with Kalinjar and Jhansi Peshwai  fought one of the toughest battles in the history of 1857 mutiny. The were jaitely defeated in " Battle of Ajaygarh in 1858. 'Raja'.

Rajas
1776–1822: Govindrao I
1822–1832: Balarao
1831–1840: Govindrao II (d. 1840)

See also
List of Maratha dynasties and states
Orai
Kalpi

References

External links
Rulers of Jalaun, Etawah and Auraiya

History of Uttar Pradesh
Jalaun district
Bundelkhand
Princely states of India
British administration in Uttar Pradesh
1806 establishments in India
1840 disestablishments in India

ca:Jalaun